The following is a list of films produced in the Kannada film industry in India in 1962, presented in alphabetical order.

See also
 Kannada films of 1961
 Kannada films of 1963

References

External links
 Kannada Movies of 1962's at the Internet Movie Database
 http://www.bharatmovies.com/kannada/info/moviepages.htm
 http://www.kannadastore.com/

1962
Kannada
Films, Kannada